Paraptila equadora is a species of moth of the family Tortricidae. It is found in Ecuador in the provinces of Pastaza and Napo).

The length of the forewings is about 10 mm. There is a red-brown patch and a similarly coloured triangular patch found on the forewings. The hindwings are uniform grey brown.

Taxonomy
The species was formerly listed as a synonym of Paraptila cornucopis.

References

Moths described in 1991
Euliini